Popular Hot Rodding was a monthly American automotive magazine from the Motor Trend Group, dedicated to high-performance automobiles, hot rods, and muscle cars. Though it focused primarily on vehicles produced from 1955 to the present day it maintained an emphasis on cars produced from the early 1960s through the mid 1970s.

The magazine's technical and feature articles (advertorials) showcased aftermarket and modified production parts and services, reviews, product announcements, news, and tuning tips. Popular Hot Rodding also covered high-profile events and the annual Engine Masters Challenge.

History
Los Angeles-based Argus Publishers Corp. began publishing Popular Hot Rodding in early 1962. On May 29, 2014 Source Interlink Media announced that it would cease production of Popular Hot Rodding as part of the company's name change to TEN, The Enthusiast Network. The last printing of Popular Hot Rodding was the September 2014 issue. Their quarterly newsstand special issue (Engine Masters) which PHR once published, is currently published and distributed by Hot Rod Magazine. Some PHR articles which were published online also have been willed to hotrod.com.

References

External links

Automobile magazines published in the United States
Monthly magazines published in the United States
Defunct magazines published in the United States
Magazines established in 1962
Magazines disestablished in 2014
Magazines published in California